A mass flow meter, also known as an inertial flow meter, is a device that measures mass flow rate of a fluid traveling through a tube. The mass flow rate is the mass of the fluid traveling past a fixed point per unit time.

The mass flow meter does not measure the volume per unit time (e.g. cubic meters per second) passing through the device; it measures the mass per unit time (e.g. kilograms per second) flowing through the device. Volumetric flow rate is the mass flow rate divided by the fluid density. If the density is constant, then the relationship is simple. If the fluid has varying density, then the relationship is not simple. For example, the density of the fluid may change with temperature, pressure, or composition. The fluid may also be a combination of phases such as a fluid with entrained bubbles. Actual density can be determined due to dependency of sound velocity on the controlled liquid concentration.

Operating principle of a Coriolis flow meter
There are two basic configurations of Coriolis flow meter: the curved tube flow meter and the straight tube flow meter. This article discusses the curved tube design.

The animations on the right do not represent an actually existing Coriolis flow meter design. The purpose of the animations is to illustrate the operating principle, and to show the connection with rotation.

Fluid is being pumped through the mass flow meter. When there is mass flow, the tube twists slightly. The arm through which fluid flows away from the axis of rotation must exert a force on the fluid, to increase its angular momentum, so it bends backwards. The arm through which fluid is pushed back to the axis of rotation must exert a force on the fluid to decrease the fluid's angular momentum again, hence that arm will bend forward. In other words, the inlet arm (containing an outwards directed flow), is lagging behind the overall rotation, the part which in rest is parallel to the axis is now skewed, and the outlet arm (containing an inwards directed flow) leads the overall rotation.

The animation on the right represents how curved tube mass flow meters are designed. The fluid is led through two parallel tubes. An actuator (not shown) induces equal counter vibrations on the sections parallel to the axis, to make the measuring device less sensitive to outside vibrations. The actual frequency of the vibration depends on the size of the mass flow meter, and ranges from 80 to 1000 Hz. The amplitude of the vibration is too small to be seen, but it can be felt by touch.

When no fluid is flowing, the motion of the two tubes is symmetrical, as shown in the left animation. The animation on the right illustrates what happens during mass flow: some twisting of the tubes. The arm carrying the flow away from the axis of rotation must exert a force on the fluid to accelerate the flowing mass to the vibrating speed of the tubes at the outside (increase of absolute angular momentum), so it is lagging behind the overall vibration. The arm through which fluid is pushed back towards the axis of movement must exert a force on the fluid to decrease the fluid's absolute angular speed (angular momentum) again, hence that arm leads the overall vibration.

The inlet arm and the outlet arm vibrate with the same frequency as the overall vibration, but when there is mass flow the two vibrations are out of sync: the inlet arm is behind, the outlet arm is ahead. The two vibrations are shifted in phase with respect to each other, and the degree of phase-shift is a measure for the amount of mass that is flowing through the tubes and line.

Density and volume measurements
The mass flow of a U-shaped Coriolis flow meter is given as:

where Ku is the temperature dependent stiffness of the tube, K is a shape-dependent factor, d is the width, τ is the time lag, ω is the vibration frequency, and Iu is the inertia of the tube. As the inertia of the tube depend on its contents, knowledge of the fluid density is needed for the calculation of an accurate mass flow rate.

If the density changes too often for manual calibration to be sufficient, the Coriolis flow meter can be adapted to measure the density as well. The natural vibration frequency of the flow tubes depends on the combined mass of the tube and the fluid contained in it. By setting the tube in motion and measuring the natural frequency, the mass of the fluid contained in the tube can be deduced. Dividing the mass on the known volume of the tube gives us the density of the fluid.

An instantaneous density measurement allows the calculation of flow in volume per time by dividing mass flow with density.

Calibration
Both mass flow and density measurements depend on the vibration of the tube. Calibration is affected by changes in the rigidity of the flow tubes.

Changes in temperature and pressure will cause the tube rigidity to change, but these can be compensated for through pressure and temperature zero and span compensation factors.

Additional effects on tube rigidity will cause shifts in the calibration factor over time due to degradation of the flow tubes. These effects include pitting, cracking, coating, erosion or corrosion. It is not possible to compensate for these changes dynamically, but efforts to monitor the effects may be made through regular meter calibration or verification checks. If a change is deemed to have occurred, but is considered to be acceptable, the offset may be added to the existing calibration factor to ensure continued accurate measurement.

See also 
Coriolis effect
Flow measurement
Gaspard-Gustave Coriolis
Oscillating U-tube

References

External links 
 Lecture slides on flow measurement, University of Minnesota

Classical mechanics
Flow meters
Mass